Olga Vladimirovna Naidenova (born 8 December 1987) is a Russian former competitive figure skater. She is the 2003 Nebelhorn Trophy bronze medalist and won three ISU Junior Grand Prix medals, including gold at the 2002 Pokal der Blauen Schwerter. She was selected to compete at the 2003 World Junior Championships, where she placed 15th, and qualified for the 2004 ISU Junior Grand Prix Final, where she placed 7th.

Programs

Competitive highlights 
JGP: Junior Grand Prix

References

External links

 

Russian female single skaters
Figure skaters at the 2007 Winter Universiade
1987 births
Living people
Figure skaters from Moscow
Competitors at the 2005 Winter Universiade